EuroTrip is a 2004 American sex comedy film directed by Jeff Schaffer and written by Alec Berg, David Mandel, and Schaffer. It stars Scott Mechlowicz, Jacob Pitts, Michelle Trachtenberg, Travis Wester, and Jessica Boehrs (in her film debut). Mechlowicz portrays Scott "Scotty" Thomas, an American teenager who travels across Europe in search of his German pen pal, Mieke (Boehrs). Accompanied by his friend Cooper (Pitts) and twin siblings Jenny and Jamie (Trachtenberg and Wester), Scott's quest takes him to England, France, the Netherlands, Slovakia, Germany, and Italy, encountering awkward, humorous, and embarrassing situations along the way.

Plot
In the town of Hudson, Ohio, Scott "Scotty" Thomas is dumped by his girlfriend Fiona immediately after his high school graduation at the beginning of the film. With his best friend, Cooper Harris, Scotty attends a graduation party that evening, where the band performs a song detailing the affair Fiona was having with the band's singer. Scotty returns home drunk and angry and reads an email from his German pen pal, Mieke—who Scotty calls "Mike"—expressing sympathy for Scotty and suggesting they meet in person. Cooper suggests that "Mike" may be a sexual predator and Scotty tells Mieke to stay away from him. Scotty's younger brother, Bert, informs him that "Mieke" is actually a common German feminine name. Realizing that he had mistaken her name and that he has feelings for Mieke, Scotty tries to contact her again, but finds that Mieke has blocked his email address. Scotty decides to travel to Europe with Cooper to find Mieke and apologize in-person.

Scotty and Cooper first arrive in London, where they befriend a Manchester United football hooligan firm, led by Mad Maynard. After a night of drinking, Scotty and Cooper wake up on a bus on their way to Paris with the hooligans. In Paris, they meet up with their classmates, Jenny and Jamie, fraternal twins who are touring Europe together. Jenny and Jamie decide to accompany Scotty and Cooper to find Mieke in Berlin. The group travels to Amsterdam, where Jamie is robbed while receiving oral sex in an alley, losing everyone's money, passports, and train tickets. They attempt to hitchhike to Berlin, but due to a language misunderstanding, they end up in Bratislava. Finding a great exchange rate with the U.S. dollar, the group goes to a nightclub. Drunk on absinthe, Jenny and Jamie make out with each other, witnessed by Scotty and Cooper, and are horrified when they realize what they are doing. The next day, a Slovak man drives them to Berlin, where they learn that Mieke has left with a summer tour group, and will be reachable in Rome for only a short time. Jamie sells his Leica Camera for plane tickets to Rome to find Mieke.

In Rome, the group heads to Vatican City, where Mieke is touring before her summer at sea. Inside the Vatican, Scotty and Cooper search for Mieke and accidentally rings the bell that signals the Pope has died. Scotty appears on a balcony and spots Mieke in the cheering crowd below, who have mistaken him for the newly elected pope; all this happens while the current pope is watching everyone. The Swiss guards realize what is going on and detain Scotty and Cooper for their actions. However, the Manchester United football hooligans from London suddenly appears at the Vatican and tells the guards to release Scotty and Cooper. Scotty finally introduces himself to Mieke and confesses his love. Mieke is happy to see him, and they have sex in a confessional booth before she leaves on her trip. On the flight back to Ohio, Jenny and Cooper give into their urges and have sex in the plane's lavatory, while Jamie stays in Europe after being hired by Arthur Frommer.

Scotty moves to Oberlin College in the fall term to begin his studies. During his phone conversation with Cooper, who is dating Jenny, Cooper asks what Scotty's new roommate looks like. Mieke knocks on the door of his room, having been assigned to the same room because of another misunderstanding about her name. Scotty and Mieke embrace and get into bed together, with Cooper calling for Scott on the other end of a still-open cell phone call and the film's closing with the Absinthe Green Fairy wondering at his own lack of a sex life.

Cast
 Scott Mechlowicz as Scott "Scotty" Thomas: A recent high school graduate who inadvertently makes the mistake of thinking his German pen pal Mieke to be a homosexual man, thanks to his limited fluency in speaking German. When he finds out that Mieke is in reality an attractive woman, Scotty travels across Europe to Berlin to beg for her forgiveness. Mechlowicz described Scotty as a flawed but kindhearted man, who is "very lucky to have such a good group of friends to prop him back up".
 Jacob Pitts as Cooper Harris: Scotty's raunchy, libidinous best friend. Pitts described Cooper as a hypersexual man who is "driven by his own base impulses ... which gets everyone else into trouble."
 Michelle Trachtenberg as Jenny: Scotty and Cooper's friend and twin sister of Jamie. Trachtenberg described Jenny as both book savvy and a risk-taker. "She is more willing to take a chance or go on an adventure, whereas Jamie always has to be convinced", said Trachtenberg.
 Travis Wester as Jamie: Jenny's twin brother. Wester described Jamie as a lifelong learner whose aspiration is "the accumulation and dissemination of knowledge".
 Jessica Boehrs as Mieke Schmidt: Scotty's German pen pal. Boehrs made her film debut with EuroTrip.

The cast also includes Vinnie Jones as Mad Maynard (leader of the Manchester United football hooligans), Lucy Lawless as Madame Vandersexxx (a sex-club dominatrix), Patrick Malahide as Arthur Frommer, Diedrich Bader as Mugger, Fred Armisen as Creepy Italian Guy, Kristin Kreuk as Fiona (Scotty's ex-girlfriend), Nial Iskhakov as Bert Thomas (Scotty's younger brother), Matt Damon as Donny (Fiona's new boyfriend), J. P. Manoux as Robot Man, and Steve Hytner as the Absinthe Green Fairy. Jeffrey Tambor (uncredited) and Cathy Meils were cast as Mr. and Mrs. Thomas, respectively.

Production
Writers Mandel, Berg, and Schaffer all directed, but only Schaffer could achieve director credit. All scenes were filmed in Prague, Czech Republic, especially in the streets close to the Rudolfinum. The opening scenes set in Ohio were filmed at the International School of Prague. The scene where the main characters are boarding at the Paris railway station was filmed in Prague's main railway station (Hlavní nádraží). The scene inside Vatican City was actually filmed in Prague's National Museum. The scenes with a German lorry driver were taken at the then-unfinished D5 motorway near Pilsen. Damon was filming The Brothers Grimm in Prague and agreed to play the punk singer; as he wore a wig for Grimm, Damon could shave his head for EuroTrip.

Reception

Critical response
Review aggregation website Rotten Tomatoes gives EuroTrip a 47% rating based on 120 reviews, and an average of 5.1/10. The site's critical consensus says, "A trip worth taking if one's not offended by gratuitous nudity and bad taste." On Metacritic, the film scored 45 out of 100 based on 30 reviews, indicating "mixed or average reviews".

In her review for Salon, Stephanie Zacharek wrote, "The giddy ridiculousness of Eurotrip is a pleasant surprise: The picture starts out slow and unsteady in its rhythms. But just when you begin to wonder if it’s ever going to get funny, or if it’s going to be merely desperate all the way through, it lifts off like a wobbly helicopter—and somehow it keeps flying."

In the New York Times, Elvis Mitchell wrote that "almost every girl in the movie with fewer than 10 lines to speak has to take her top off." In his review for Village Voice, Michael Miller criticized the film for its "constant anxiety that women might turn out to be men and vice versa."

Box office
The film was released in the United States and Canada on February 20, 2004, in 2,512 theaters. Over its opening weekend, the film grossed $6.7 million. It went on to gross $17.8 million in the United States and Canada and $3 million in other territories, for a worldwide total of $20.8 million.

Home media 
The film was released on DVD in the U.S. on June 1, 2004, in an R-rated theatrical version (90 minutes) and an "Unrated" extended version (92 minutes). The theatrical version was released on Blu-ray in 2013. The “Unrated” extended edition was released on Blu-Ray in 2022

Legacy
Although not as successful at the box office as the producers' Road Trip (2000), EuroTrip did well on home video and became a cult classic. Ultra Culture blogger Charlie Lyne, who introduced a screening of the film in 2011 at the Institute of Contemporary Arts, wrote in 2012 that "EuroTrip is satire at its most brazenly self-loathing and audaciously entertaining".

Damon reportedly has said that despite appearing in notable films like Saving Private Ryan, The Talented Mr. Ripley, and the Bourne franchise, fans often repeat "Scotty doesn't know!" to him.

Soundtrack

 
 "Scotty Doesn't Know" – Lustra
 "My Generation" – Chapeaumelon (The Who cover)
 "Wild One" – Wakefield
 "99 Red Balloons" – Goldfinger (Nena cover)
 "In the City" – The Jam
 "Shooting Stars" – Cauterize
 "Are You Gonna Be My Girl" – Jet
 "Nonchalant" – Chapeaumelon
 "Scotty Doesn't Know" (Euro Version) – MC Jeffsky
 "Make My Dreams Come True" – Apollo 440
 "Du" – David Hasselhoff (Peter Maffay cover)
 "Les Promesses" – Autour De Lucie
 "I Love Marijuana" – Linval Thompson
 "Turn It Up" – Ugly Duckling
 "Get Loose" – The Salads

References

External links

 
 

2004 films
2004 comedy films
2004 directorial debut films
2000s American films
2000s comedy road movies
2000s English-language films
2000s teen sex comedy films
American comedy road movies
American sex comedy films
American teen comedy films
BDSM in films
Culture in Bratislava
DreamWorks Pictures films
Films about drugs
Films about infidelity
Films about vacationing
Films scored by James L. Venable
Films set in 2004
Films set in Amsterdam
Films set in Berlin
Films set in London
Films set in Ohio
Films set in Paris
Films set in Rome
Films set in Slovakia
Films set in Vatican City
Films shot in the Czech Republic
Films with screenplays by Alec Berg
Films with screenplays by David Mandel
Films with screenplays by Jeff Schaffer
Incest in film
The Montecito Picture Company films
Twins in American films